The Isle of Man has a rich transport heritage and boasts the largest narrow-gauge railway network in the British Isles with several historic railways and tramways still in operation. The Isle of Man Railway Museum in Port Erin allows people to find out more about the history of the Manx railways, and was until 1998 accompanied by a similar museum in Ramsey, which was dedicated to the history of the electric line, but this was closed and converted into a youth club. The steam railway to the south of the island, electric to the north and mountain line to the summit of Snaefell, the island's only mountain, are all government-owned, and operated under the title Isle of Man Railways, as a division of the island's Department of Infrastructure. The lines at Groudle Glen and Curraghs Wildlife Park are both privately owned but open to the public.

Lines
The lines listed in the table are or have been open to the general public.

There have been various other railways on the Isle of Man that have never been open for public transport, such as those in the various mines around the island. Among these are/were:
Glenfaba
 Glenfaba Brickworks Tramway
 Knockaloe branch line, owned by the IMR, for Knockaloe Internment Camp internees and supplies
 Peel Harbour Tramway, construction railway, steam locomotives, built 1864 or 1865 and dismantled 1873.
 Incline railway connecting to the Peel Harbour Tramway, self-acting incline.
 Corrin's Hill,  horse-drawn construction railway connecting a stone quarry to the incline railway.
 St. John's Gravel Line
Garff
 A second Laxey Mine tramway, horsedrawn, on the lower washing floor, constructed around 1865 and lasted until at least 1918
Middle
 Crogga Valley Railway, a private garden railway
 Douglas Breakwater Crane Railway
 Douglas Holiday Camp
 A construction railway to the Injebreck Reservoir, built 1899, length  from Hillberry to the Reservoir, worked with steam locomotives.
Rushen
 Port Erin Breakwater Railway, a construction line for the Port Erin Breakwater. , steam traction, built 1864.

About fifty other minor tramways, in the various mines, quarries and sand pits, or on RAF gunnery lines, existed on the island.

See also

Isle of Man
List of heritage railways
British narrow gauge railways
Mountain railway
Transport in the Isle of Man
Sodor

References